is a Japanese football player. He plays for Vonds Ichihara.

Playing career
Koya Saito played for Yokogawa Electric, FC Machida Zelvia, SC Sagamihara and Grulla Morioka from 2009 to 2014. He joined to Vonds Ichihara in September 2015.

References

External links

1986 births
Living people
Chuo University alumni
Association football people from Saitama Prefecture
Japanese footballers
J3 League players
Japan Football League players
Tokyo Musashino United FC players
FC Machida Zelvia players
SC Sagamihara players
Iwate Grulla Morioka players
Vonds Ichihara players
Association football defenders